The Simony Hut is an Alpine club hut belonging to the Austrian Alpine Club (OeAV) located at a height of 2,205 metres, just below the Hallstätter Glacier at the foot of the Hoher Dachstein in Austria. The hut, which is named after Friedrich Simony the first person to ascend Hoher Dachstein, is high above Hallstatt in Upper Austria in the northern part of the Dachstein Mountains. It is open year-round and, in winter, offers numerous options for ski tours and snowshoe walking.

The Simony Hut is an important base for climbers because they are able to set out from here on long tours over the Dachsteins. There is also a mountaineering school where training courses are run for glacier or ice climbing. The Dachstein Chapel is nearby.

History 

In 1843 a stone rest and emergency shelter, known as "Hotel Simony", was opened just below the site of the present hut.

In 1876, Friedrich Simony selected the present location himself for construction of the first free-standing wooden building. The opening ceremony was held on 18 August 1877. Over a decade later, the hut had become a popular destination for climbers. The structure was enlarged between 1891 and 1893 to compensate for the increasing numbers of visitors. Further works were carried out from 1922 to 1933, and the hut underwent a general restoration in 1953. No further alterations were made to the original structure after the last major renovations between 1961 and 1963 when a power supply was also added.

In 1977, the Simony Hut a celebrated its centenary as a climbing and alpine training centre. In 1989 a biological treatment plant was opened to treat human waste (upgraded in 1998). A large modern annex was opened in July 1999.

As the Simony Hut lies near the Hallstätter Glacier, most routes require knowledge of glacier crossing with appropriate equipment. The only exceptions are the paths to the Wiesberg House and the Gjaidalm.

Approaches 
 From Gjaidalm (1,750 m, Dachstein Cable Car from Obertraun) via the Hüttenweg path, medium difficulty, duration:  hours
 From Hunerkogel (2,690 m, Dachstein South Face Cable Car from Ramsau) via the Hallstätter Glacier, only for the experienced, with Klettersteig equipment, duration:  hours
 From Hallstatt (515 m) via the Wiesberg House, physically challenging, duration: 6 hours
 From Obertraun (540 m, valley station Dachstein Cable Car) via the Gjaidalm, physically challenging, duration: 6 hours

Crossings 
As the Simony Hut lies near the Hallstätter Glacier, most routes require knowledge of glacier crossing with appropriate equipment. The only exceptions are the paths to the Wiesberg House and the Gjaidalm.
 Wiesberg House (1,887 m) via Hochplateau, medium difficulty, duration: 1 hour
 Adamek Hut (2,196 m)
 via Hohen Trog and Hoßwandscharte (wind gap), medium difficulty, duration:  hours
 via Hallstätter Glacier, Steinerscharte (wind gap) and Gosau Glacier, duration:  hours
 Seethaler Hut (2,740 m) via the Hallstätter Glacier, duration:  hours
 Dachsteinsüdwand Hut (1,910 m) via Hallstätter Glacier and Hunerscharte (wind gap), duration:  hours
 Austria Hut (1,638 m) via Hallstätter Glacier, Austriascharte (wind gap) and Edelgrieß, duration: 5 hours
 Guttenberg House (2,146 m) via Hallstätter Glacier, Gjaidstein saddle and Gruberscharte (wind gap), duration: 6 hours
 Schilcher House (1,740 m) on the Gjaidalm, via the Hochplateau, medium difficulty, duration: 2 hours

Ascents 
 Hoher Dachstein (2,995 m) via Seethaler Hut, only for the experienced, UIAA grade I-II, safety features in places, duration:  hours
 Hoher Gjaidstein (2,794 m) via Eisseen, Gjaidkar and Notbiwak, only for the experienced, pathless in places, duration:  hours
 Hoher Ochsenkogel (2,520 m) via the Hohen Trog, medium difficulty, pathless in places, but signed, duration: 2 hours
 Schöberl (2,422 m) via the medium difficulty Klettersteig, only with equipment, duration: 45 minutes
 Taubenkogel (2,301 m), duration: c. 2 hours
 Other summits only climbable with Alpine experience and local knowledge because they are largely pathless: Hohes Kreuz (2,837 m), Niederer Dachstein (2,934 m), Eisstein (2,654 m)

See also 
 Laufen Hut, at the foot of the Fritzerkogel mountain in Salzburg, Austria.

References 

Mountain huts in Austria
Dachstein Mountains
Gmunden District
Buildings and structures in Upper Austria